The World lexicon of Tolnai (Hungarian "Tolnai világlexikona"), after a long preparatory work, was first published in 1912, when only 8 volumes were published. The publication of additional volumes that had already been prepared was prevented by the First World War, largely rendering obsolete the contents of the published and still edited volumes of the series.

The editorial of the lexicon, considering the circumstances, decided not to end the series but to restart it (with a more concise volume breakdown). The result of this decision was the New world lexicon of Tolnai.

Order of volumes 

Hungarian encyclopedias